IEEE Xplore digital library is a research database for discovery and access to journal articles, conference proceedings, technical standards, and related materials on computer science, electrical engineering and electronics, and allied fields. It contains material published mainly by the Institute of Electrical and Electronics Engineers (IEEE) and other partner publishers. IEEE Xplore provides web access to more than 5 million documents from publications in computer science, electrical engineering, electronics and allied fields. Its documents and other materials comprise more than 300 peer-reviewed journals, more than 1,900 global conferences, more than 11,000 technical standards, almost 5,000 ebooks, and over 500 online courses. Approximately 20,000 new documents are added each month. Anyone can search IEEE Xplore and find bibliographic records and abstracts for its contents, while access to full-text documents may require an individual or institutional subscription.

See also 
 ACM Digital Library
 IEEE Computer Society Digital Library
 List of academic databases and search engines

References

External links 
 

Institute of Electrical and Electronics Engineers
Bibliographic databases in engineering
Bibliographic databases in computer science
Full-text scholarly online databases
Academic journal online publishing platforms